The Matei class (マテイ) locomotives were a class of steam tender locomotives of the Chosen Government Railway (Sentetsu) with 4-8-2 wheel arrangement. The "Mate" name came from the American naming system for steam locomotives, under which locomotives with 4-8-2 wheel arrangement were called "Mountain".

Description

With the development of mining operations in the northern part of Korea, traffic volumes increased significantly, and Sentetsu found a need for a locomotive with strong pulling power suitable for use on mountainous lines with sharp curves and steep slopes. The locomotive designed in response to this need was not of the 2-8-2 Mika type, which was Sentetsu's standard freight locomotive type, but of the Mate type with 4-8-2 wheel arrangement; the leading bogie was designed to reduce flange wear on the wheels. The resulting Matei class locomotives became a mainstay on long-distance freight trains on mountainous lines.

The Gyeongseong Works undertook two major design projects at the end of the 1930s: that of the Pashiko-class express passenger locomotive, and the Matei-class freight locomotives for use on steep mountain lines. Each was the largest of their type operated by Sentetsu, and the first unit of each type was rolled out in 1939. After the first two were built at Gyeongseong in 1939 and 1940, a further 48 were built from 1941 through to the end of Japanese rule by Kisha Seizō in Japan.

Postwar
After the Liberation and subsequent partition of Korea, both the Korean National Railroad (KNR) in the South and the Korean State Railway (Kukch'ŏl) in the North operated Matei-class locomotives. Not all survived the Pacific War, as there were only 77 of 83 built of both classes that remained in 1946; of these, 33 went to the Korean National Railroad in the South, and 44 to the Korean State Railway in the North. The six locomotives of both classes that remain unaccounted for were likely either destroyed during the Pacific War or were possibly taken by Soviet Army, which during its occupation of North Korea took a large number of locomotives back to the USSR.

Korean National Railroad Mateo1 class (마터1)
Of the 33 4-8-2s that went to the KNR in the 1947 division of assets, most were likely Matei-class, which were designated 마터1 class by the KNR; the identities of twelve of these are known for certain.

Korean State Railway Madŏha class (마더하)

Around eleven Matei class locomotives went to the north, where they were initially designated 마더하 class (Madŏha) by Kukch'ŏl; later, around the 1970s, they were renumbered in the 7100 series, retaining their original running number but replacing the "마더하" with a "7". The identities of two are known for certain.

On 31 December 1950, a passenger train operated by Kukch'ŏl, consisting of マテイ10 - still wearing Sentetsu number plates - and 25 cars, running on the former Kyŏngŭi Line from Hanp'o to Munsan, was ordered to stop at Changdan by the US Army and was destroyed. The locomotive is now on display at Imjingak.

Construction

References

Locomotives of Korea
Locomotives of South Korea
Locomotives of North Korea
Railway locomotives introduced in 1939
4-8-2 locomotives
Gyeongseong Works locomotives
Kisha Seizo locomotives